FPT University is a private university in Vietnam. FPT University is a member of FPT Group and has campuses in Hanoi (main), Ho Chi Minh City, Da Nang, Can Tho and Quy Nhon (in progress). The initials FPT stand for "Financing and Promoting Technology."

History 
When founded in 2006, Associate Professor Truong Gia Binh, FPT Corp chairman of management board, was in charge of FPT University chairman,
while Dr. Le Truong Tung was the first dean. It is the first private university to be opened in Vietnam.

Dr Le Truong Tung was in the position of FPT University Rector as well as chairman of BoD in 2011. Dam Quang Minh has been rector since September 2014, the youngest rector in Vietnam at that time. There are currently 20,000 students at FPT University studying full academic bachelor, partnership program, postgraduate, polytechnic and high school.

All instructors are required to have two years' working experience in the IT industry, and have to sit for an entrance examination. Foreign language teaching would form an integral part of the curriculum, and they aim to recruit native-speaking foreign language teachers and subject area teachers who can deliver their lessons in English. After one year of language preparation, students will reach English level from Luk to transition 6 or can be placed in classes from luk to transition 6 if they take part in the English entrance exam or can be specialised. if you have ielts certificate from 6.5, a foreign language would be used as the medium of instruction for all courses. English would not be the only such language used; the Vietnam Software Association are working with the school's embedded software faculty to establish a programme in Japanese.

FPT University will award a scholarship named Nguyen Van Dao to honour the memory of his great support when FPT University was founded. Professor Nguyen Van Dao was a world-acclaimed mathematician and one of Vietnam's leading education administrators. Microsoft, which is a strategic partner of the managing organization FPT, have an arrangement with the university to offer training to their students on Microsoft technologies. At approximately US$13,600 for the four-year course of study, the university's fees are extremely high, especially when compared to the US$720 cost of four years at a public university.

The fight to gain permission to open the university itself represented a rarity in Vietnam; the Ministry of Education (Vietnam) were originally unwilling to grant permission for the university to be opened, and delayed for two months the necessary approval for the university to begin enrolling students. FPT used the media to put pressure on the ministry, which eventually signed the official approval document on 15 November 2006.

The university runs a collaborative program with the University of Greenwich, England, the UK. The off-site Top-up +2, which began in August 2009, is a collaborative program between the University of Greenwich in the U.K. and FPT University in Vietnam and is currently the only program in Vietnam that awards Aptech graduates a U.K. bachelor's degree in one year.

Hanoi 

Located Khu công nghệ cao Hoà Lạc - Km29, ĐTC08, Thạch Hoà, Thạch Thất, Hà Nội
Located Hà Nội

Ho Chi Minh City 
Located at  Lô E2a-7, Đường D1 Khu Công nghệ cao, P.Long Thạnh Mỹ, Q.9, TP.Hồ Chí Minh.

Da Nang 
Khu đô thị FPT City, Ngũ Hành Sơn, Đà Nẵng, Việt Nam

Can Tho 
Cầu Rau Răm, đường Nguyễn Văn Cừ nối dài, An Bình, Ninh Kiều, Cần Thơ, Việt Nam

Quy Nhon 
R639+HM2, Khu đô thị mới, Thành phố Qui Nhơn, Bình Định 55117

See also
 Higher education in Vietnam
 List of universities in Vietnam

External links

 Official website

References

Official homepage

Educational institutions established in 2006
Universities in Ho Chi Minh City
Universities in Da Nang
Universities in Hanoi
2006 establishments in Vietnam